Sevira (a Vulgar Latin spelling of the Classical Latin name Severa) was a purported daughter of the Roman Emperor Magnus Maximus and wife of Vortigern mentioned on the fragmentary, mid-ninth century C.E. Latin inscription of the Pillar of Eliseg near Valle Crucis Abbey, Denbighshire, Wales.

The inscription was commissioned by Cyngen ap Cadell (died 855), king of Powys, in honour of his great-grandfather Elisedd ap Gwylog (reign 725–755), who is here claimed to be a descendant of "Britu son of Vortigern, whom Germanus blessed, and whom Sevira bore to him, daughter of Maximus the king, who killed the king of the Romans."

The Pillar of Eliseg inscription is the only known source for a daughter of Magnus Maximus named Sevira (or Severa).

Further reading
 Bartrum, Peter C. "SEVERA daughter of MAXIMUS.", in A Welsh Classical Dictionary: People in History and Legend up to about A. D. 1000, p. 236. National Library of Wales, 1993. Emended 2009, p. 672.
 Charles-Edwards, T. M., Wales and the Britons, 350-1064, Oxford University Press, Oxford, 2013, p. 414ff.

External links
 The Pillar of Eliseg inscription on the Celtic Inscribed Stone Project website. 

Daughters of Roman emperors
5th-century Welsh women